Valerie Biden Owens (November 5, 1945) is an American political strategist, campaign manager and former educator. She is the younger sister of Joe Biden, the 46th and current President of the United States. In 2016, president Barack Obama nominated her Alternate Representative of the United States to the 71st Session of the General Assembly of the United Nations.

Owens has played a substantial role in all of her brother's political campaigns. She was the campaign manager during all of his Senate elections and for his 1988 and 2008 presidential campaigns, as well as a senior advisor to his successful 2020 presidential campaign. Owens published her autobiography, Growing Up Biden, in 2022.

Early life and education
She was born the daughter of Catherine Eugenia "Jean" (née Finnegan; 1917–2010) and Joseph Robinette Biden Sr. (1915–2002). Her brothers are Joe, Francis "Frank" Biden, and James "Jim" Biden. Her family is of Irish Catholic background. Biden's father was initially wealthy, but later suffered several financial setbacks; for several years the family lived with Biden's maternal grandparents in Scranton, Pennsylvania. Joe Biden Sr. later became a successful used car salesman, maintaining the family a middle-class lifestyle.

Owens graduated from Ursuline Academy in Wilmington, Delaware in 1963, and went on to study at the University of Delaware, where she was on the dean's list and was homecoming queen, graduating in 1967.

Career
After college, Owens was a teacher at Wilmington Friends School before focusing on politics.

From 1997 until 2016, she served as executive vice-president of Joe Slade White & Company, a media consultant firm. Owens has worked with the service organization Ministry of Caring for over 35 years and sits on their Board of Directors.

She has worked extensively with Women's Campaign International to help teach women how to develop and grow their political skills. In 2013, Owens traveled with her brother Joe Biden to the Vatican City as an official U.S. delegate for the inauguration of Pope Francis.

In 2014, Owens was a Resident Fellow at the Harvard Institute of Politics. In 2017, Owens was a featured speaker at a Ted Talk conference in Wilmington, Delaware. Owens is vice-chair of both the Biden Institute at the University of Delaware and the Biden Foundation. Owens returns to the University of Delaware periodically to give lectures on politics and her experiences as a woman on the campaign trail.

She has traveled around the world as a motivational speaker, and teacher of leadership and communication seminars. She helped to found the Owens-Patrick seminar group. Owens currently sits on the advisory board for the University of Nevada, Las Vegas Public Policy Institute.

Owens has played a substantial role in all of her brother's political campaigns dating back to his first campaign, for the New Castle County, Delaware council in 1970. Owens managed for Joe Biden's 1988 presidential campaign. In 2008, Owens and Ashley Judd campaigned together in North Carolina at several events in support of Barack Obama and Joe Biden.

Joe Biden mentioned her in his presidential acceptance speech on November 7, 2020. Owens was in attendance at the event in Wilmington, Delaware, where she also met Maya Harris, the sister of Vice President-elect Kamala Harris.

Personal life
Owens' first husband was Bruce Saunders, whom she married shortly after graduating college. Bruce and Valerie moved in with Joe Biden and his two sons, Hunter and Beau, following the death of her sister-in-law Neilia in a car crash in December 1972. Valerie helped look after her nephews so that Joe could begin his first term as senator in 1973. Valerie and Bruce had both worked on Joe Biden's first Senate campaign in 1972.

Owens is married to attorney John T. Owens, with whom she has three children: son Cuffe Owens, also an attorney, and two daughters, Missy Owens and Casey Owens Castello. John T. Owens was a friend of Joe Biden's during their law school years at Syracuse University. The two were wed in a Roman Catholic ceremony at the Church Center for the United Nations in 1975. In October 2021, Cuffe Owens married reality TV star Meghan King. They separated two months later and the marriage was later annulled.

Awards and honors
The University of Delaware bestowed an Honorary Doctorate of Law to her in 2018.
Harvard University honored her with their 'Women Inspiring Change" award in 2015.
Ursuline Academy inducted her to their Distinguished Alumnae Hall of Fame in 2018.

In 2021, Forbes listed Owens on their Impact List of 50 Women over 50 who are inspiring change in their communities through social entrepreneurship, law, advocacy and education.

References
30.   ↑ White House Archives for President  Barack Obama  09/13/2016

External links
 
 
 

1945 births
20th-century American educators
20th-century American women educators
American campaign managers
American political activists
American political consultants
American women academics
Biden family
Catholics from Delaware
Communications consultants
Harvard Fellows
Delaware Democrats
Living people
Motivational speakers
University of Delaware alumni